Bartholomaea is a genus of two species of flowering plant in the family Salicaceae, native to Mexico, Guatemala, and Belize.

References

Salicaceae
Salicaceae genera